Jayachamarajendra Road, or simply J.C. Road, is a street in the heart of Bangalore, the state capital of Karnataka, India, named after Maharaja Jayachamaraja Wadiyar. It is located in Kalasipalyam and connectes with Kasturba Road to the north. The road houses many important landmarks of the city such as the BBMP Head Office, Bangalore Town Hall, and Ravindra Kalakshetra; is also lies in close proximity to the Lal Bagh Botanical Gardens.  Sri Bhagawan Mahaveer Jain College lies along the road.

Features

References

External links
 J C Road

Roads in Bangalore
Tourist attractions in Bangalore